Calaveras Dome is a Granite dome in Northern California best known as a rock climbing venue. Climbing was active from the 1950s on with a revival during the 70's and 80's.  Several dedicated climbers actively developed new routes.  Jay Smith, Jeff Altenburg, Paul Crawford, Bob Pinkney, and several others pushed the area into a new realm.  Today this is a visited area with climbers from around the world visiting this remote and still un-crowded and beautiful area.

Landforms of Calaveras County, California
Rock formations of California
Climbing areas of California
Tourist attractions in Calaveras County, California